Adriano Durante (24 July 1940 – 23 June 2009) was an Italian professional road bicycle racer.

Major results

1963
Giro del Lazio
Giro del Piemonte
Milano–Vignola
Giro di Campania
Giro d'Italia:
Winner stage 8
1964
Giro della Romagna
1965
Col San Martino
Coppa Bernocchi
Giro della Provincia di Reggio Calabria
Giro d'Italia:
Winner stages 4 and 9
Tour de France:
Winner stage 13
1966
Milano–Vignola
1967
Aiello del Friuli
1968
Gran Premio Industria e Commercio di Prato
1970
Milano–Vignola

External links 

Official Tour de France results for Adriano Durante

Italian male cyclists
1940 births
Italian Tour de France stage winners
Italian Giro d'Italia stage winners
2009 deaths
Sportspeople from Treviso
Cyclists from the Province of Treviso